Heinrich Kreuzer (sometimes written as Kreutzer) (16 February 1819 – 26 October 1900) was a well-known Austrian Jewish opera singer.

Life 
Kreuzer was born in Vienna and received his singing education at the Vienna Conservatory as well as from Giuseppe Ciccimarra. In 1835, he performed at the Theater am Kärntnertor in Vienna, 1836 in Laibach and further in Brünn, Frankfurt, Cologne and Mannheim. After two guest appearances in 1844 and 1847, he was engaged by the Vienna Court Opera as Principal Tenor on 19 May 1849 . He temporarily retired from singing on 31 March 1856 due to a vocal cord ailment, but returned to perform there from 1 April 1861 to 31 October 1866.

In 1867, he took over the directorship of the Court Theatre in Coburg and in 1870 that of the municipal theatre in Koblenz. Kreuzer died on 26 October 1900 in Baden bei Wien

His daughters, Elisabeth ("Elise") and Marie were also opera singers. Elise's relationship with Prince Paul of Thurn and Taxis, which started in October 1866, caused a major scandal. Their eventual morganatic marriage resulted in her husband having to give up his title and rank and change his name to "Paul von Fels". His younger daughter, Marie (born on 11 March 1839 in Salzburg, died on 7 January 1904 in Ulm), married the actor Ludwig Barnay in 1864. The couple divorced in 1880.

References 

Austrian operatic tenors
19th-century Austrian Jews
Musicians from Vienna
1819 births
1900 deaths
Jewish opera singers
19th-century Austrian male opera singers